This page provides summaries of the 1998 COSAFA Cup, the second edition of the tournament.

Qualifying round

Final round

External links
COSAFA Cup 1998 Details at RSSSF.com

Cosafa Cup, 1998
COSAFA Cup
International sports competitions hosted by Zambia